Joymontop Union is a Union in Singair, Manikganj District, Bangladesh.

Joymontop High School

References

Manikganj District
Unions of Singair Upazila